Seven Beaver Lake is a lake in the U.S. state of Minnesota.

The lake's name comes from the Ojibwe Indians of the area, who hunted beavers near the lake.

See also
List of lakes in Minnesota

References

Lakes of Minnesota
Lakes of Lake County, Minnesota
Lakes of St. Louis County, Minnesota